is a railway station in Kamikawa, Kamikawa, Hokkaidō Prefecture, Japan. Its station number is A43.

After Kami-Shirataki Station ceased operation in 2016, Shirataki Station as adjacent station from this station with distance of 37.3 km, make longest distance between any stations on JR ordinary lines (not include shared tracks with shinkansen).

Lines
Hokkaido Railway Company
Sekihoku Main Line

References

Adjacent stations

Railway stations in Hokkaido Prefecture
Railway stations in Japan opened in 1923